The GP20D is a four-axle B-B switcher built by MotivePower and Electro-Motive Diesel. To date, only 40 units have been produced by EMD, all of which were manufactured during June 2000. The GP20D is also a hood unit with lowered long and short hoods based on MotivePower's earlier MP2000D locomotives. The changes between the MK2000D and the GP20D are primarily in the control electronics, making them easier to use than the older model.

The similar appearing EMD GP15D does not have dynamic brakes.

Original Buyers

See also
 List of GM-EMD locomotives

References

External links

B-B locomotives
GP20D
Railway locomotives introduced in 2000
Diesel-electric locomotives of the United States
EPA Tier 2-compliant locomotives of the United States
Standard gauge locomotives of the United States